Noel Arthur Meredyth Gayler (December 25, 1913 – July 14, 2011) was an admiral in the United States Navy, who served as the sixth Director of the National Security Agency from 1969 to 1972, and ninth Commander of Pacific Command from 1972 to 1976. Gayler was awarded three Navy Cross medals as a World War II flying ace and is credited with five aerial victories while flying for VF-2 and VF-3. Gayler was an ardent advocate for nuclear disarmament.

Early life
Gayler was born in Birmingham, Alabama, entered the United States Naval Academy on June 6, 1931, and was commissioned an ensign in the United States Navy on June 6, 1935.

Naval career
Gayler's first assignment was as an Engineering Officer on the battleship , then the destroyer , followed by service as the Gunnery Officer on the destroyer .

In March 1940, Gayler entered flight training at Naval Air Station Pensacola, Florida, and was designated a Naval Aviator in November 1940. He was assigned to fighter squadron VF-3 in November 1940, and was credited with destroying five enemy aircraft in aerial combat. Between February and May 1942 Gayler was awarded the Navy Cross three times, the first person to achieve this.

He was transferred to NAS Anacostia in Washington, D.C., in June 1942 to serve as a VF Project Officer. From June 1943 to June 1944, Gayler served as a test pilot at NAS Patuxent River, Maryland. He next served as Commanding Officer of VF-12 from June 1944 to February 1945. Gayler was Air Operations Officer for the 2nd Carrier Task Force from March to November 1945.

Gayler was an ardent advocate for nuclear disarmament. As  a lieutenant commander and a fighter pilot, he flew over Hiroshima six days after the first atomic bomb was dropped on August 6, 1945. He was stunned and saw nothing moving, and vowed to work to eliminate nuclear weapons.

Gayler then served as Executive Officer, and then Deputy Director of Special Devices Center from February 1946 to April 1948. Gayler was Operations Officer on the carrier  from April 1948 to September 1949, before heading the Fighter Design Branch in Washington, D.C., from October 1949 to June 1951.

Gayler was Commanding Officer of the Navy's experimental jet fighter squadron VX-III (VX-3) at Atlantic City, New Jersey, from June 1951 to January 1954. Gayler served in the Office of the Chief of Naval Operations from January 1954 to January 1956, and then became Commanding Officer of the seaplane tender  from January 1956 to February 1957. He was Operations Officer for the Commander in Chief, Pacific Fleet, from February to June 1957, and then served as a Naval Aide to the Secretary of the Navy from June 1957 to April 1959.

Gayler commanded the aircraft carrier  from May 1959 to June 1960, and then served as the U.S. Naval Attache in London, England, from August 1960 to August 1962. Gayler was commander of Carrier Division 20 from August 1962 to August 1963, and then served as Assistant Chief of Naval Operations for Development from August 1963 to August 1967. He was Deputy Director of the Joint Strategic Target Planning Staff at Offutt Air Force Base, Nebraska, from September 1967 to July 1969.

Gayler became the 6th Director of the National Security Agency in July 1969, serving in that position until he became Commander in Chief of United States Pacific Command (CINCPAC) in August 1972. Gayler served as CINCPAC until his retirement from the Navy on August 31, 1976. As the CINCPAC, Admiral Gayler had the honor of personally welcoming returning U.S. prisoners of war during the Vietnam War following their repatriation at Clark Air Base in the Philippines. They reported back to duty to him as they walked off the plane.

Gayler died July 14, 2011 in Alexandria, Virginia.

Awards and decorations
Here is the ribbon bar of Admiral Noel A. M. Gayler:

See also

Gray Eagle Award

References

1910s births
2011 deaths
Military personnel from Birmingham, Alabama
United States Naval Academy alumni
United States Navy admirals
American World War II flying aces
United States Navy personnel of World War II
Aviators from Alabama
Recipients of the Navy Cross (United States)
Recipients of the Navy Distinguished Service Medal
Recipients of the Legion of Merit
Recipients of the Defense Distinguished Service Medal
Burials_at_Arlington_National_Cemetery